The Mexico women's national football team (Spanish: Selección Nacional de México Femenil) represents Mexico in international women's football. The team is governed by the Mexican Football Federation and competes within CONCACAF, the Confederation of North, Central American and Caribbean Association Football. It has won gold medals in the Central American and Caribbean Games and a silver medal in the Pan American Games, as well as a silver and bronze in the Women's World Cup prior to FIFA's recognition of the women's game. In addition to its senior team, Mexico also has U-20, U-17, and U-15 teams. The U-17 team reached the final of the 2018 FIFA U-17 Women's World Cup, and the U-15 cohort earned the bronze medal in the 2014 Youth Olympic Games.

The senior team was originally established in 1963, but its first FIFA-recognized game was in 1991. Mexico senior team has participated in three Women's World Cups and one edition of the Summer Olympic Games.

Pedro López is the current national team's manager, after taking the role in late 2022.

History

Unofficial era
Although not officially recognized by FIFA until 1991, Mexico's team was actually established in 1963, when many countries still had bans on women's football. In the 1950s, both Costa Rica and Argentina witnessed increased interest in the women's game and held tours in various countries. In 1963, Las Ticas, the Costa Rica women's national football team, spent six months in Mexico conducting a tour to increase exposure of the game. Observing the success of Las Ticas, Mexico formed its first team to play in opposition to Costa Rica.

Led by Alicia Vargas, Mexico placed third in the 1970 Women's World Cup, a tournament FIFA has yet to acknowledge. Mexico fell 2–1 in the semifinal to hosts Italy before defeating England 3–2 in the third place match. The following year, Mexico hosted the 1971 Women's World Cup, which has also yet to be officially recognized. The squad reached the final but fell 3–0 to Denmark. An estimated 110,000 people attended the final at Estadio Azteca, which is the largest crowd ever to witness a women's soccer game; FIFA has not recognized this attendance record either.

To participate in each world cup, teams had to qualify. Mexico faced Peru, Argentina, South Africa en route to the 1971 edition.

Modern era
In the 1980s, when a series of mundialitos took place, Mexico participated in the 1986 edition. Mexico was placed in Group A along with Italy and Japan, but the team did not advance beyond the first stage.

Mexico's first official appearance in the Women's World Cup was in 1999, when the United States hosted the tournament. The team also qualified in 2011 and 2015, hosted by Germany and Canada, respectively. Likewise, the team qualified for the Summer Olympic Games in 2004. In all four instances, El Tri Femenil failed to advance beyond the group stage; in fact, the team has yet to win a single game in either major tournament.

The first official coach for the Mexico women's national football team was Leonardo Cuéllar. One of his first objectives was to qualify for the 1999 Women's World Cup. The team accomplished this by placing second to Canada in the 1998 CONCACAF Women's Championship. However, much controversy arose regarding the nationalities of the recruited players. Preference was given to US-born players of Mexican heritage, largely because Mexico did not have an official league at the time. Andrea Rodebaugh, the team's then-captain, argued that the team's main goal was to qualify; she also wanted to strengthen the team and celebrate its official recognition. Despite the controversy, the team went on to participate in the 1999 Women's World Cup with a mix of US-born and Mexican-born players.

In recent years, an increase in young talent developing in Mexico brought an increase of expectations from Mexican football fans and media alike. Following their worst ever World Cup finish in 2015, fans began calling for Cuellar's resignation or firing. In 2016, the women's national football team failed to qualify for the Olympics, and lost to Costa Rica, which was the turning point in the team's history since many thought the defeat resulted in Mexico becoming the fourth-best team in CONCACAF. With these results and Leonardo Cuellar's controversial decision to not bring Charlyn Corral and Kenti Robles, who had terrific seasons at their clubs in Spain's Primera División, onto the squad led to his resignation from his position in April 2016. Roberto Medina became the head coach in 2017.

In 2018 Mexico won the Central American and Caribbean Games by defeating Costa Rica 3–1 in the final.

At the 2018 CONCACAF Women's Championship Mexico entered as the third highest ranked team behind the United States and Canada. At the tournament Mexico finished third in their group with a record of one win and two losses, which included a surprising 2–0 loss to Panama. As a result of not advancing to the knockout round, Mexico was unable to qualify for the 2019 FIFA Women's World Cup in France. Medina was replaced by U-20 coach Christopher Cuellar, Leo Cuellar's son. His tenure was short-lived, having placed fifth in the 2019 Pan American Games (despite absences from the United States and Canada) and after failing to qualify for the 2020 Olympics. He was replaced in January 2021 by Mónica Vergara, who led the U-17 squad to the 2018 FIFA U-17 Women's World Cup final.

Notable matches
Mexico's first recorded international game was against Austria during the 1970 Women's World Cup, when squad beat the European side 9–0 in the group stage. However, to participate in this inaugural tournament, teams had to qualify, so La Tri played against other teams prior to this match.

Before the modern era, Mexico defeated England 2–1 in the third place match of the 1970 Women's World Cup, the first edition of the tournament. In front of a record-breaking crowd, the team also reached the final of the 1971 Women's World Cup, but fell 3–0 to Denmark.

Among the most notable victories is when the team finished second in the 2010 CONCACAF Women's Gold Cup. Hosts of the cup, Mexico defeated the United States in the semifinal for the first and only time before falling to Canada in the final.

Team image

Nicknames
The Mexico women's national football team has been known or nicknamed as the "El Tri Femenil" or "La Tri."

Home stadium

The Estadio Azteca, also known in Spanish as "El Coloso de Santa Úrsula", was built in 1966. It is the official home stadium of the Mexico women's national team, as well as the Mexican club team Club América (women). It has a capacity of 87,000 seats (after renovation works) making it the largest football-specific stadium in the Americas and the third largest stadium in the world for that sport.

Domestic recognition
In various occasions, fans have showed up in large numbers to support La Tri. When Mexico played against Denmark in the 1971 Women's World Cup final, over 100,000 showed up at Estadio Azteca. Likewise, when Mexico played Argentina in a playoff game to qualify for the 1999 Women's World Cup, over 70,000 fans were in attendance.

Until recently, attention around the women's team was dwarfed by the men's squad. Few matches were televised or advertised, limiting knowledge around the team's achievements and struggles. Former ESPN commentator Nelly Simón frequently advocated for more attention to this team. Likewise, after winning the gold medal at the 2018 Central American and Caribbean Games, Kenti Robles called on news outlets and fans to pay more attention to them. However, with increased attention in the women's game after the establishment of the women's league in 2017, more games have been televised. Since then, millions watched Mexico play in the U-17 world cup final against Spain in 2018.

Player preparation
Many national team players currently play in the Liga MX Femenil, Mexico's first-division women's league. Some players also play in the United States via the NWSL or the NCAA, while others elect to play in Spain's Primera Divisíon. A few have played or currently play in the top women's leagues in Australia, China, England, France, Japan, Italy, Israel, the Netherlands, Portugal, and Sweden.

Overall official record

Results and fixtures

The following is a list of match results in the last 12 months, as well as any future matches that have been scheduled.

Legend

2022

2023

 Historical results (1923–present) – FMF.mx
 Fixtures and Results – Soccerway.com

Coaching staff

Current coaching staff

Manager history

Winning percentages calculated according to FIFA's points scale.

, after the match against .1. Gil Monterd (1991–1998): As La Tri's first official coach between 1991 and 1998, Monterd took an inexperienced and under-resourced squad to the 1991 CONCACAF Women's Championship in Port-au-Prince, Haiti. Sending only one qualifier from the confederation to the 1991 FIFA Women's World Cup, this tournament fielded eight teams divided into two groups. Matches were also only 80 minutes long. In Group A, Mexico lost to eventual winner United States 12–0, its worst ever appearance. With a loss against Trinidad and Tobago and a win against Martinique, Mexico finished third in the group, failing to advance to the semifinals. Likewise, during the 1994 CONCACAF Women's Championship, which determined the two qualifiers for the 1995 FIFA Women's World Cup, Mexico finished in third place, failing to reach the international tournament yet again.

2. Leonardo Cuéllar (1998–2016): Once a highly touted player for the Mexico men's national football team, Cuéllar took over El Tri Femenil after a brief stint as the women's soccer coach at CSULA. Head coach until 2016—a period of 18 years—Cuéllar had a questionable record. As head coach, Mexico only qualified for the world cup on three occasions and the Olympics once; his teams never won a single game in any major tournament, nor did they finish first in the CONCACAF Women's Gold Cup. Common criticism of his leadership was his nepotism and overreliance on US-born players. Cuéllar was never at risk of losing his job despite dubious results, and he even hired close allies, including his son Christopher Cuéllar. He also regularly held tryouts in the United States without doing the same in Mexico.

Initially charged with taking the squad to the 1998 CONCACAF Women's Championship, which would award 1.5 qualification slots to the 1999 Women's World Cup, he was successful in qualifying for the team's first ever appearance at the official tournament. Finishing first in its group and winning against Guatemala in the semifinal, Mexico eventually fell 1–0 to Canada in the final. Mexico went on to qualify for the cup after defeating Argentina in the CONCACAF-CONMEBOL playoff match. Cuéllar was very lucky to qualify. The tournament expanded from 12 teams to 16 teams and the United States was the host, so their squad automatically qualified; had these two changes not been made, Mexico would have likely been out.

Cuéllar went on to schedule friendlies and participate in organized tournaments, but with few victories. The team qualified for 2011 and 2015, but his coaching style remained consistent. Frustration grew among his players after his call-ups involved much controversy. As players like Charlyn Corral and Kenti Robles demanded change, Cuéllar began to omit them from future squads. Likewise, he discriminated against Stephany Mayor and Bianca Sierra for being in a relationship, leading to their infrequent call-ups as well. His reign eventually ended when Mexico failed to qualify for the 2016 Summer Olympics.

3. Roberto Medina (2016–2018): Promoted from U-20 squad to the senior team without any official announcement from the FMF, Medina served as head coach from 2016 to 2018. With few victories—including a 3–0 win against Venezuela early in his tenure, his technique was essentially a continuation of Cuéllar's style. Though he was praised after Mexico won the gold during the 2018 Central American and Caribbean Games, he was relieved of his position after failing to advance out of the group stage during the 2018 CONCACAF Women's Championship. With losses to Panama and the United States, Mexico did not qualify for the 2019 FIFA Women's World Cup despite having the Liga MX Femenil and the most talented generation it had seen up until this point. Historically weaker teams, such as Jamaica and Panama, advanced further than the squad, signifying that other teams had surpassed Mexico. After his ouster, he became head coach of Tigres. Medina had been the U-20 coach one other time, but elected to coach a men's team just before a world cup.

4. Christopher Cuéllar (2019–2020): With no official announcement, Cuéllar Jr. replaced Medina after the team failed to qualify for 2019. Cuéllar, the son of Leonardo Cuéllar, was promoted after serving as the U-20 women's squad coach. Like his predecessors, Cuéllar Jr. has had limited results. During the 2019 Pan American Games, La Tri finished in fifth place after failing to advance beyond the group stage despite the absence of both the United States and Canada. Throughout his first 21 games as DT, the team has had 6 victories, 5 draws, and 10 losses. Their best win has been against the Czech Republic, then ranked 28th in the world (with whom they've also tied), whereas their worst loss was against Paraguay, ranked 48th. Despite upcoming dates like the 2018 FIFA U-20 Women's World Cup, Cuéllar Jr. was seen working with men's teams. #FueraCuellar has trended on Twitter multiple times. On January 18, 2021, the FMF announced that Cuéllar was relieved of his duties as head coach, nearly a year after the team's last match.

5. Mónica Vergara (2021–2022): On January 19, 2021, the FMF formally announced Vergara as the full team's head coach. Prior to rising to the highest level, Vergara was an assistant coach and eventually head coach for each of the U-15, U-17, and U-20 squads. She led the U-15 team to the bronze medal at the 2014 Youth Olympic Games in Nanjing, China. She also led the U-17 team to a second-place finish at the 2018 FIFA U-17 Women's World Cup, the best result of any Mexican women's team at a world cup. Vergara also led the U-20 squad to a second-place finish of the 2020 CONCACAF Women's U-20 Championship to qualify for the 2020 FIFA U-20 Women's World Cup, but the event was postponed by a year before eventually being canceled due to the COVID-19 pandemic. Vergara's hiring has coincided with increased engagement from the Federation. The women's national team now has its own social media accounts, and the team has scheduled more friendlies during FIFA dates. In addition, she has recruited more players from the Liga MX Femenil. All of these were great signs for this growing team, which qualified for the 2022 CONCACAF W Championship. However, during the competition Mexico performed poorly, and were eliminated from the group stage without a goal or a win and didn't qualify for the 2023 FIFA Women's World Cup. 
On August 15, 2022, the FMF announced that Vergara was relieved of her duties as head coach, a month after the CONCACAF W Championship.

6. Miguel Ángel Gamero, Cristian Flores (2022): 

7. Pedro López (2022–present):

Players

Current squad
The following 26 players were named to the squad  to play the 2023 Women's Revelations Cup.Caps and goals accurate as of 22 February 2023 after match vs. Colombia.Recent call-ups
The following players were called up to a squad in the last 12 months.

Notable players
Charlyn Corral: First Mexican women's player to win the Pichichi Trophy.
Renae Cuéllar: First player to ever score a goal in the NWSL.
Maribel Dominguez: Mexico's top international goal scorer of all time, among both men's and women's squads, earning her the nickname "Marigol." Current coach of the U-20 women's team.
Janelly Farías: Spoke at Harvard University in October 2020 to discuss sexuality, gender, language, and culture in sports.
Katie Johnson: Most Valuable Offensive Player of the 2016 NCAA College Cup.
Stephany Mayor: Among the first-ever out LGBTQIA+ Mexican athletes and featured along with her fiancée Bianca Sierra in The New York Times.
Desirée Monsiváis: Goal leader for the Liga MX Femenil.
Mónica Ocampo: Scored a golazo against England in the 2011 World Cup, which was selected by fans as the greatest Women's World Cup goal ever.
Nicole Pérez: Silver ball winner for the 2018 FIFA U-17 Women's World Cup.
Kenti Robles: Winner of the 2019 Trofeo EFE.
Andrea Rodebaugh: Current FIFA instructor and major advocate for women's sports.
Carla Rossi: Head coach of Querétaro Femenil.
Jenny Ruiz-Williams: Head coach of the UNLV Rebels.
Cecilia Santiago: Youngest goalkeeper ever to appear in a Men's or Women's World Cup.
Bianca Sierra: Among the first-ever out LGBTQIA+ Mexican athletes and featured along with her fiancée Stephany Mayor in The New York Times.
Alicia Vargas: In 1999, she was named third best woman player of the century by CONCACAF.
Fabiola Vargas: Head coach of Tijuana Femenil
Mónica Vergara: Former head coach of the Mexican national women's national team. Former head coach of the U-15, U-17, and U-20 squads. Led the U-15 team to a bronze medal at the 2014 Youth Olympic Games and the U-17 team to a second-place finish at the 2018 U-17 Women's World Cup.
Christina Murillo : Represented Mexico for the World Cup at the U17, U20 and Senior Level. She is married to Richard Sánchez who also represented Mexico in soccer at the U17, U20 and U23 levels.

Records*Players in bold are still active, at least at club level.Most capped players

Top goalscorers

Competitive record
Source: miseleccion.mx

FIFA Women's World Cup*Draws include knockout matches decided on penalty kicks.Olympic Games*Draws include knockout matches decided on penalty kicks.CONCACAF W Championship*Draws include knockout matches decided on penalty kicks.Pan American Games*Draws include knockout matches decided on penalty kicks.Central American and Caribbean Games*Draws include knockout matches decided on penalty kicks.Other tournaments

FIFA World RankingsLast update was on 10 December 2021'':
Source:

 Best Ranking   Worst Ranking   Best Mover   Worst Mover

See also

Sport in Mexico
Football in Mexico
Women's football in Mexico
Mexican Football Federation (FMF)

National teams
Women's
Mexico women's national football team
Mexico women's national football team results
List of Mexico women's international footballers
List of Mexico women's national football team managers
Mexico women's national under-20 football team
Mexico women's national under-17 football team
Men's
Mexico national football team
League system
Mexican football league system
Liga MX Femenil
Liga Mexicana de Fútbol Femenil

References

External links

 Official website
 Mexico profile at FIFA.com

 
North American women's national association football teams